Hanseo University is a private university located in Seosan, Taean and Namsan, South Korea.  The university was established in 1991 and provides courses in a wide range of liberal arts, engineering and design disciplines.

The Cradle of Chiropractic Education in Asia
HSU Chiropractic Program is accredited by The Council on Chiropractic Education Australasia. The Department of Chiropractic is also member of the Association of Chiropractic College and Consortium of Chiropractic Institutions Asia Pacific. HSU is an official IBCE and NBCE testing center, the only one in the Asia. This is DC and MS combined program.

Hanseo International College of Aviation
Hanseo University is a private university located in Chungcheongnam-do, approximately 150 kilometers south of Seoul. 
The University was founded in late 1989 when the Korean Ministry of Education granted permission for its establishment. The groundbreaking ceremony for its main campus, located near the city of SeoSan, took place in April 1990 and it accepted its first undergraduate enrolments in March of 1992. The University initially offered programs across ten departments: Mathematics, Physics, Chemistry, Electronic Statistics, Computer and Information, Electronic Engineering, Chemical Engineering, Clothing and Textiles, English and English Literature, and Chinese. In 1995 it offered its first post graduate programs with master’s degrees available in Chemistry, Computer, Physics, Chemical Engineering, and English and English Literature. In 1996, the first graduates were produced with 207 individuals successfully completing their studies.
In 2000, Dr. Ham Ki Sun (the University’s founder) was inaugurated as its fifth president and subsequently adopted a strategy to evolve the University into an institution that specialized in the disciplines of Aeronautics, Arts and Design.

Academics

Undergraduate
 Physical Therapy
 Nursing- Radiology 
 Occupational Therapy 
 Rehabilitation Technology
 Health Management 
 Dental Hygiene
 Cosmetology
 Security and Secretarial Services 
 Physical Activity Design 
 Maritime Sports
 Motion Picture & Visual Arts(direction, staff, acting)
 Space Design
 Industrial Design
 Fashion Design
 Motion Graphics
 Contemporary Music
 Conservation of Cultural Heritage
 Children's Art Education
 Visual Design
 Mathematics
 Chemistry
 Biological Sciences 
 Environmental Engineering
 Food, Chemical Biological Engineering
 Advanced Materials Science and Engineering
 Airport Architecture
 Civil Engineering
 Computer Engineering
 Electronic Engineering
 English
 Chinese
 Japanese
 Media Practical Korean Language & Literature
 Elderly Welfare
 International Relations
 Mass Communication and Journalism
 Child-Adolescent Welfare
 Public Administration
 Aeronautical Engineering
 Flight Operation
 Air Transportation & Logistics
 Air Tourism and Service
 Aerospace Software Engineering
 Avionics Engineering
 Helicopter Operation
 Unmanned Aircraft Systems
 Aviation and Leisure Industry

Graduate
The Graduate School was established in September, 1995, as the heart of human resources training and research. It includes 27 departments for master's degree programs, 18 departments for doctoral degree programs, and four Professional Graduate Schools with 22 departments for master's degree programs. It lives up to its reputation as the sanctuary of knowledge and information that helps your dreams mature.
  Doctor's Programs:
Chiropractic, Elderly Welfare, Child-Adolescent Welfare, Public Administration, Biology, Chemistry, Physical Therapy, Flight Operation and Management, Advanced Materials & Engineering, Architecture, Environmental Engineering, Digital Forensics, Lifelong Education, Cultural Properties, Healthcare, Aerospace Software Engineering, Construction Engineering, Convergence Design
  Master's Programs:
English Language and Literature, East Asian Studies, Elderly Welfare, Child-Adolescent Welfare, Public Administration, International Trade & Business, Aviation Tourism, Biology, Chemistry, Physical Therapy, Occupational Therapy, Flight Operation and Management, Radiological Science, Dental Hygiene, Air Transportation, Chemical Engineering, Advanced Materials & Engineering, Architecture, Environmental Engineering, Digital Forensics, Civil Engineering, Aerospace Software Engineering, Globalized International Relations, Lifelong Education, Rehabilitation Science, Optical and Electronic Engineering
 The Graduate School
 Graduate School of Health Promotion (Chiropractic, Natural Health Management, Radiological Science, Exercise Physiology and Prescription)
 Graduate School of Education (Foreign Language Education(English), Educational Administration, Mathematics Education, Physical Education, Counseling Psychology Education, Beauty Education, Art Therapy Education, Music Therapy Education)
 Graduate School of Aeronautics, Information and Industry (Korean-Chinese Language and Culture, Elderly Welfare, Public Administration, Business Administration, Cosmetology, Avionics, Aerospace Software Engineering, Aviation Sports)
 International Graduate School of Art & Design (Child art study, Interior Design, Architectural Design, Music, Animation, Industrial Design, Fashion Design, Cultural asset Preservation, Film & Theatre)

International Education Programs
Hanseo University exchanges students and faculty through sister relations with 58 universities in 12 countries, and around 500 foreign students study at the school. The international Red Cross Youth scholarships in particular, started in 2001 and selects young Red Cross members from Asian Pacific countries with the International Federation of Red Cross and Red Crescent Societies and the Republic of Korean National Red Cross. The scholarship provides students with a four-year scholarship to produce global talents who will spread a mind of humanitarianism and make Korea known to the world. The Institute of the Korean Language and Culture provides five stages of Korean language classes from beginner to advanced including listening, speaking and writing. It trains experts who understand Korean society and culture through hands-on education, including field trips.

References

External links
Hanseo University
Department of Chiropractic
International Board of Chiropractic Examiners

Seosan
Private universities and colleges in South Korea
Universities and colleges in South Chungcheong Province
Aviation schools
Educational institutions established in 1992
1992 establishments in South Korea